Feeder Dam Bridge, also known as the Eel River Bridge and Clay County Bridge No. 208, is a historic Whipple through truss bridge located in Harrison Township and Sugar Ridge Township, Clay County, Indiana. It was built in 1894 and carries Towpath Road over the Eel River. It consists of a single  span and rests on stone abutments.

It was added to the National Register of Historic Places in 2000.

See also
List of bridges documented by the Historic American Engineering Record in Indiana

References

External links

Historic American Engineering Record in Indiana
Truss bridges in the United States
Road bridges on the National Register of Historic Places in Indiana
Bridges completed in 1894
Transportation buildings and structures in Clay County, Indiana
National Register of Historic Places in Clay County, Indiana
Whipple truss bridges in the United States